Julia Görges and Petra Martić were the defending champions, but both chose not to participate.

Nina Bratchikova and Darija Jurak won the title defeating Akgul Amanmuradova and Alexandra Dulgheru in the final 6–4, 3–6, [10–6].

Seeds

Draw

Draw

References
 Main Draw

Al Habtoor Tennis Challenge - Doubles
Al Habtoor Tennis Challenge
2011 in Emirati tennis